Melody A. Swartz (born April 1969) is William B. Ogden Professor in Molecular Engineering at the University of Chicago. She was previously a professor at École Polytechnique Fédérale de Lausanne. She won a 2012 MacArthur Fellowship and a 2002 Beckman Young Investigators Award. In 2006, she was named one of Popular Science Magazine's "Brilliant 10." She was elected to the American Academy of Arts and Sciences in 2018.

She graduated from Johns Hopkins University with a bachelor's degree in chemical engineering and from the Massachusetts Institute of Technology with a Ph.D. also in chemical engineering.

References

External links
Biophysics.org
Nccr-oncology.ch

Academic staff of the École Polytechnique Fédérale de Lausanne
Living people
1969 births
MacArthur Fellows
Fellows of the American Academy of Arts and Sciences
University of Chicago faculty
Johns Hopkins University alumni
Massachusetts Institute of Technology alumni
American women engineers
20th-century American engineers
20th-century women engineers
21st-century American engineers
21st-century women engineers